Eoreuma crawfordi is a moth in the family Crambidae. It was described by Alexander Barrett Klots in 1970. It is found the United States, where it has been recorded from Iowa and Indiana.

References

Haimbachiini
Moths described in 1970